Dillwynia dillwynioides is a species of flowering plant in the family Fabaceae and is endemic to the south-west of Western Australia. It is a low-lying or erect, spindly shrub with cylindrical, grooved leaves and yellow, red or orange flowers with yellow, red or orange markings.

Description
Flowering occurs from August to December.

Taxonomy and naming
This species was first formally described in 1844 by Carl Meissner in Lehmann's Plantae Preissianae and was given the name Aotus dillwynioides. In 1917, George Claridge Druce changed the name to Dillwynia dillwynioides in The Botanical Exchange Club and Society of the British Isles Report for 1916.

Distribution
This dillwynia grows in winter-wet depressions in the Swan Coastal Plain biogeographic region of south-western Western Australia.

Conservation status
This species is classified as "Priority Three" by the Government of Western Australia Department of Parks and Wildlife meaning that it is poorly known and known from only a few locations but is not under imminent threat.

References

dillwynioides
Eudicots of Western Australia
Taxa named by Carl Meissner
Plants described in 1844